Mary Breen (3 January 1933 – 1 October 1977) was an Australian athlete. She competed in the women's shot put at the 1956 Summer Olympics.

References

1933 births
1977 deaths
Athletes (track and field) at the 1956 Summer Olympics
Australian female shot putters
Olympic athletes of Australia
Place of birth missing